The Directorate of General Security (DGS) also known as Internal State Security was a domestic Iraqi intelligence agency.

History
The DGS was founded in 1921 during the Iraqi monarchy, and it operated under the Ministry of the Interior until 1968. Its police and army officers were charged with the "general security of the state and its property", which included the use of torture and monitoring of dissent.

Kzar coup
Nadhim Kzar was named director by Saddam Hussein in 1969 after the DGS had deteriorated under 10 years (1958–1968) of army rule. Kzar was known for his sadism, and during his term the DGS tortured and killed thousands. Much of this violence was directed against the Iraqi Communist Party and Iraqi Kurds; Kzar twice attempted to assassinate Kurdish leader Mustafa Barzani.

Kzar was a Shia Muslim and angered by the Sunni hold on power in Iraq. He led an ultimately unsuccessful coup in 1973 against President Ahmed Hassan al-Bakr, including taking hostage both Minister of the Interior Sa'adiun Gheidan and Army Chief of Staff and Minister of Defense General Hamid Shehab. Bakr was to be assassinated when his plane landed in Baghdad, but a flight delay caused Kzar to abort the assassination and flee with his hostages. As Kzar's convoy attempted to escape to Iran, it was attacked by Iraqi helicopter gunships, leading to Kzar's capture, General Shehab's death, and Gheidan's bodily injury. Kzar was judged for his actions and found guilty on July 7 by the Iraqi Revolutionary Command Council under Izzat Ibrahim ad-Douri, then executed that same month.

Reorganization
As a result of the attempted 1973 coup, Saddam Hussein sought a secret agreement with KGB head Yuri Andropov late that same year, leading to a close relationship that included intelligence exchange, Iraqi training in KGB and GRU schools, thorough DGS reorganization under KGB guidance, provision of surveillance and interrogation equipment, and Iraqi embassy support of Soviet agents in countries without Soviet relations.

A 1974 Political Report of the Arab Socialist Baath Party' acknowledged the failings of the government in controlling the DGS:"The State security service, though reinforced throughout by Party members and independent patriots, was an immense machine which, under previous regimes, had used blackmail against the party and other national movements, and thus had evolved a peculiar psychology. To reform it, to make it adopt new values and practices was therefore very difficult. It has indeed made serious mistakes during the period under review [1968–1973], to the detriment of the Party's reputation and policy in various fields. The leadership was at fault in allowing this sensitive organisation to operate without rigorous and careful control. Some officers of this service abused the confidence placed in them by the Party, to the extent of conspiring against the Party, as in the plot of 30 June 1973. This criminal enterprise alerted the Party to the dangers of inadequate control, and extensive changes were made."

Saddam Hussein era
The DGS was reestablished as an independent entity reporting directly to President Hussein in the late 1970s or 1989. In 1980, Hussein decided to expand Ba'athist ideology within the ranks by appointing as DGS Director his first cousin Ali Hassan al-Majid. Majid led the DGS throughout the Iran–Iraq War, transforming it into a political force notorious for "torture, kidnapping, murder, and rape".

During the 1991 uprisings in Iraq, the DGS was targeted by insurgents, including a battle at its Sulaymaniyah headquarters. Tons of documents were seized by Kurdish guerrillas and civilians, and while much was shipped to the United States, some were kept by Kurdish parties and individuals. The uprising led Saddam Hussein to create the Emergency Forces (Qawat al-Tawaria), a new paramilitary branch of the agency. The DGS also began to solicit greater information on foreigners in Iraq, with reports coming in from taxi drivers like those around the Al-Rashid Hotel and from Ministry of Culture and Information guides and translators, who were a journalist's only option when visiting Iraq.

In 2002, Jane's Intelligence Review reported that the DGS employed 10,000 personnel, mainly Ba'ath Party members.

In April 2002, a defector who had been a lieutenant colonel in the DGS stated that 40% of the rank and file DGS personnel were not showing up for work, instead preparing forged papers to exchange for dollars and euros.

The last director of DGS before the American-led invasion, Rafi Abd al-Latif Tilfah al-Tikriti, was the jack of hearts in the U.S. military's most-wanted Iraqi playing cards. According to the U.S. Defense Intelligence Agency, he was a leader in the insurgency against Coalition forces. As of 2018, he remained wanted by the Iraqi government and is still at large.

The DGS was officially dissolved on May 23, 2003, per Order Number 2 of the Coalition Provisional Authority under L. Paul Bremer.

Known directors
Nadhim Kzar (1969–1973)
Ali Hassan al-Majid (1980–1987)
Abdul Rahman al-Duri (1987–1991)
Sabawi Ibrahim al-Tikriti (1991–1996)
Taha Abbas al-Ahbabi (1996–)
Tahir Jalil al-Habbush (1997–1999)
Rafi abd al-Latif Tilfah al-Tikriti (1997–2003)

See also
Law enforcement in Iraq
Iraqi Intelligence Service – Former external Iraqi security agency
Directorate of General Military Intelligence – Former Iraqi military intelligence agency
Iraqi Special Security Organization – Former security agency responsible for security of VIPs
U.S. list of most-wanted Iraqis

References

1921 establishments in Iraq
2003 disestablishments in Iraq
Defunct Iraqi intelligence agencies
Government agencies established in 1921
Organizations disestablished in 2003
Organizations of the 1991 uprisings in Iraq